Guilford Township is one of twenty-three townships in Jo Daviess County, Illinois, USA. At the 2010 census, its population was 1,206 and it contained 1,972 housing units.

Geography

Cemeteries
The township contains Singers Catholic Cemetery.

Major highways
  U.S. Route 20.
  Illinois Route 84.

Landmarks
 The Galena Territory, a census-designated place.

Demographics

School districts
 River Ridge Community Unit School District 210.
 Scales Mound Community Unit School District 211.

Political districts
 Illinois's 16th congressional district.
 State House District 89.
 State Senate District 45.

References
 
 United States Census Bureau 2007 TIGER/Line Shapefiles.
 United States National Atlas.

External links
 Jo Daviess County official site.
 City-Data.com.
 Illinois State Archives.
 Township Officials of Illinois.

Townships in Jo Daviess County, Illinois
Townships in Illinois